Gerardo Vacarezza (born 16 August 1965) is a Chilean former professional tennis player.

Vacarezza, who was born in Santiago, reached a best singles ranking on the professional tour of 165 in the world. He won two titles on the Challenger Tour and made his only Grand Prix (ATP Tour) main draw appearance at Buenos Aires in 1986, where he made the second round.

A right-handed player, Vacarezza featured in five Davis Cup ties for Chile from 1986 to 1991. Vacarezza won one of his three singles rubbers, which came against Brazil's Nelson Aerts. He also had a doubles win over future world number one Mark Knowles of the Bahamas.

Challenger titles

Singles: (2)

See also
List of Chile Davis Cup team representatives

References

External links
 
 
 

1965 births
Living people
Chilean male tennis players
Tennis players from Santiago
Tennis players at the 1991 Pan American Games
Pan American Games competitors for Chile